Christoph Weiditz (1498, Strasbourg or Freiburg im Breisgau  - 1559, Augsburg) was a German painter, medalist, sculptor and goldsmith. His artistic development goes from a naïve-German record of the Renaissance influences to a clever mannerism. Christoph Weiditz is one of the four most important German medalist of the Renaissance, alongside Hans Schwarz, Friedrich Hagenauer and Matthes Gebel.

Life

He was the son of Hans Wydyz, Wyditz or Widitz (ca. 1460 - 1520), a sculptor who worked in Freiburg between 1497 and 1514. He was also the brother of Hans Weiditz, the Younger (1493–1537), a famous woodcut artist.

Between 1528 and 1529 he stayed in Spain and made drawings of the folk costumes the inhabitants of the Iberian Peninsula.

Gallery

Bibliography 

 Christoph Weiditz, Authentic Everyday Dress of the Renaissance. All 154 Plates from the „Trachtenbuch“. Nachdruck der Ausgabe Berlin 1927. Dover Publications, New York NY 1994, .
  Theodor Hampe (dir.), Das Trachtenbuch des Weiditz von seinen Reisen nach Spanien (1529) und den Niederlanden (1531/32), 1927. Réimpression : , New York NY, Dover Publications, 1994  (Google Books, extraits). 
 Andrea McKenzie Satterfield, The assimilation of the marvelous other: Reading Christoph Weiditz's Trachtenbuch (1529) as an ethnographic document (full text).

References

External links 

 Christoph Weiditz in the Victoria and Albert Museum
 wissen-digital
 Basque clothes of the 16th century
 Christoph Weiditz's Trachtenbuch (1530/1540) in the German National Museum

1498 births
1559 deaths
German printmakers
German male painters
16th-century German painters
German Renaissance painters
German medallists
German ethnologists
Artists from Strasbourg
16th-century German sculptors
German woodcarvers
German goldsmiths